Inconceivable is an American medical drama television series revolving around a fertility clinic, which was broadcast on NBC. The program premiered on September 23 2005 and ended after seven episodes on November 4, 2005. The series was created by Oliver Goldstick and Marco Pennette. Goldstick and Pennette also served as executive producers as did Brian Robbins and Mike Tollin. The show was a Touchstone Television and Tollin/Robbins production, one of the few shows produced by the former not to air on ABC in recent years. After only two episodes of the series aired, it was pulled from the air in early October due to low ratings, and was cancelled by NBC just a few days later.

Premise 
The show revolves around the professional and personal lives of those who work at the Family Options Fertility Clinic. The clinic is run by its co-founders Rachel Lu (Ming-Na) and Dr. Malcolm Bowers (Jonathan Cake) along with their new partner Dr. Nora Campbell (Angie Harmon). The staff includes an attorney Scott Garcia (David Norona), a nurse Patrice (Joelle Carter), office manager Marissa (Mary Catherine Garrison) and a medical technician Angel (Reynaldo Rosales).

Cast 
 Ming-Na – Rachel Lu
 Jonathan Cake – Dr. Malcolm Bowers
 David Norona – Scott Garcia
 Reynaldo Rosales – Angel Hernandez
 Joelle Carter – Patrice Locicero
 Mary Catherine Garrison – Marissa Jaffee
 Angie Harmon – Dr. Nora Campbell

Episodes

References

External links 
 

NBC original programming
2000s American medical television series
2005 American television series debuts
2005 American television series endings
2000s American drama television series
English-language television shows
Television series by ABC Studios
Television series by Disney–ABC Domestic Television
Television series by Tollin/Robbins Productions